Drama Glacier is the 10 km long and 1.5 km wide glacier in Petvar Heights on the east side of southern Sentinel Range in Ellsworth Mountains, Antarctica, which is situated north of Carey Glacier and Gabare Glacier, east of the east-northeast ridge of Mount Landolt, and south of Razboyna Glacier.  It is draining east-northeastwards to join Rutford Ice Stream northeast of Long Peak.

The glacier is named after the settlement of Drama in Southeastern Bulgaria.

Location
US mapping in 1961, updated in 1988.

See also
 List of glaciers in the Antarctic
 Glaciology

Maps
 Vinson Massif.  Scale 1:250 000 topographic map.  Reston, Virginia: US Geological Survey, 1988.
 Antarctic Digital Database (ADD). Scale 1:250000 topographic map of Antarctica. Scientific Committee on Antarctic Research (SCAR). Since 1993, regularly updated.

References
 Drama Glacier SCAR Composite Antarctic Gazetteer
 Bulgarian Antarctic Gazetteer. Antarctic Place-names Commission. (details in Bulgarian, basic data in English)

External links
 Drama Glacier. Copernix satellite image

Glaciers of Ellsworth Land
Bulgaria and the Antarctic